Moselem Springs is an unincorporated community in Berks County, Pennsylvania, United States. It is located at the roundabout junction of Pennsylvania Route 662 (Moselem Springs Road) and U.S. Highway 222 in Richmond Township. 

Buildings in the area include the Richmond Township Municipal Building, Lehigh Valley Health Network's Health Center at Moselem Springs in a historic inn constructed circa 1852, and the former Richmond Elementary School. The place name comes from the Unami-Len'api term Masch'il'am'ek, which means "trout." In Minsi-Len'api "trout" is Mesch'ila'meek.

Gallery

References

External links

Unincorporated communities in Berks County, Pennsylvania
Unincorporated communities in Pennsylvania